Dillinger is a 1945 gangster film telling the story of John Dillinger.

The film was directed by Max Nosseck. Dillinger was the first major film to star Lawrence Tierney. The B-movie was shot in black and white and features a smoke-bomb bank robbery edited into the film from the 1937 Fritz Lang film You Only Live Once. The film was released on DVD by Warner Bros. for the Film Noir Classic Collections 2 in 2005, even though the film generally is not regarded as  being film noir. Some sequences were shot at Big Bear Lake, California.

Plot summary
A newsreel plays, summing up the gangster life of John Dillinger in detail. At the end of the newsreel, Dillinger's father walks onto the stage and speaks to the movie audience about his son's childhood back in Indiana, which he says was ordinary and not very eventful, but concedes that his son had ambitions and wanted to go his own way. The young Dillinger left his town to find his fortune in Indianapolis, but soon ran out of money. The scene fades to a restaurant, where John is on a date and finds himself humiliated by the waiter who refuses to accept a check for the meal; John excuses himself, runs into a nearby grocery store and robs it for $7.20 in cash. He makes the clerk at the store believe he has a gun in his hand under the jacket.

John is soon arrested for this felony, and he is sentenced to prison. When incarcerated, he becomes good friends with Specs Green, his cell mate. Specs is an infamous bank robber whose gangMarco Minnelli, Doc Madison and Kirk Ottoare also in the same prison. John is impressed by Specs and his experience and intelligence, and begins to look up to him as a father figure.

Because John has a much shorter sentence, he decides he will be the gang's outside help when he is released, intending to facilitate their escape. As soon as John is free, he holds up the box office at a movie theater. Before he does, he flirts with the female clerk, Helen Rogers, with the result that she refuses to identify him in the police line-up after the robbery. Instead she goes on a date with John.

John continues his criminal spree of robberies for money to finance the escape of Specs' gang. When he has enough, he devises a plan to smuggle a barrel of firearms to the gang at their quarry job site. The plan succeeds, they add John to their gang, then start a crime wave of robberies in the American Midwest.

Specs sends John to scout for new targets because he is the only one not recognized by the witnesses at the quarry at the time of the gang's escape. John checks out the Farmer's Trust Bank, where he poses as a potential customer to get inside the office. He reports back to the gang that the security system is too sophisticated for them to bypass.

Specs still wants to hit the bank, and getting tired of John's ego and trigger-happiness, he decides to get help from outside the gang. John suggests another way to get into the bank – with gas bombs. John convinces the rest of the gang of his way, and they successfully rob the bank. Back at the hideout, John demands the leader's usual double share of the loot. After John is captured but escapes from jail, he kills Specs and takes his place as the leader of the gang. Running low on cash, they decide to rob a mail train. In the process, gang member Kirk Otto is killed.

The gang part for a few weeks to lay low, and John and Helen go on a big shopping spree. They meet with the rest of the gang at a cabin lodge owned by Kirk's surrogate parents. They stay there for a while, but when the elderly couple calls the police, Dillinger kills them. Later, they realize that the police are closing in on them, so they plan to head to the Western States and continue robbing banks. Before going, Dillinger and his girlfriend spend an evening at the Biograph movie theater in Chicago. Exiting the theater, Dillinger sees the police coming after him. In a gunfight, he is killed in an alley, his only money is $7.20the same as what he took in his first robbery.

Cast

Production
Philip Yordan was an emerging writer who had been collaborating with George Beck. The King Brothers had a deal with Monogram Pictures and wanted Beck to write them a gangster picture but could not offer Beck's regular fee so he recommended Yordan instead. Yordan wrote Dillinger, but Monogram's head of production Steve Broidy thought it would cost $50,000 and would be too expensive unless they could hire a name actor to play the lead, like Chester Morris. Yordan wanted Lawrence Tierney to play the role as "boy he looked like Dillinger and he was mean". He refused to see the script unless he was cast. Yordan went on to write other scripts for the King Brothers instead, The Unknown Guest and When Strangers Marry. Both were successful, and Tierney was cast in Dillinger, which was given a decent budget.

Yordan says that William Castle was meant to direct the film and he was great assistance on the script.

Robert Tasker also may have worked uncredited on the script.

Reception
According to Philip Yordan, all the major studios had an agreement not to make movies that might glorify actual gangsters by name, but Monogram was not part of it. He says Louis B. Mayer asked Frank King to destroy the negative, but King refused when Mayer did not offer any compensation. Yordan says the film made $4 million of which he got a third. It is not known whether this pact actually existed.

Yordan believes he should have won the Academy Award for Best Script, but that the Academy, led by Walter Wanger, deliberately overlooked it in favor of Marie Louise, "some picture made in Switzerland that nobody had ever seen".

Yordan also claims that "Dillinger was one of the early crime films of its type. Darryl Zanuck ran that picture again and again, and used it for the basis of many pictures at Fox. In other words, I had created a style."

Awards
Yordan was nominated for the Oscar for Writing Original Screenplay, earning Monogram Pictures its first Oscar nomination for a feature-length film release.

The film is recognized by American Film Institute in these lists:
 2003: AFI's 100 Years...100 Heroes & Villains:
 John Dillinger – Nominated Villain

See also
 List of American films of 1945

References

External links

 
 
 
 
 
 Review of film at Variety

1945 films
1940s biographical drama films
1945 crime drama films
American biographical drama films
American crime drama films
Films about John Dillinger
American black-and-white films
1940s English-language films
Films scored by Dimitri Tiomkin
Films directed by Max Nosseck
Films set in Indiana
Monogram Pictures films
1940s American films